The Roman Catholic Diocese of Gamboma is a Catholic diocese located in the town of Gamboma in the Ecclesiastical province of Brazzaville in the Republic of the Congo.

History
On 22 February 2013, Pope Benedict XVI established the Diocese of Gamboma from the Diocese of Owando.

Ordinaries
Urbain Ngassongo (2013–present)

References

Roman Catholic dioceses in the Republic of the Congo
Christian organizations established in 2013
Roman Catholic dioceses and prelatures established in the 21st century
Roman Catholic Ecclesiastical Province of Brazzaville